"Name & Number" is a song by British record producer and DJ Shift K3Y. The song was released in the United Kingdom on 17 May 2015 as a digital download. The song was written and produced by Shift K3Y.

Music video
A music video to accompany the release of "Name & Number" was first released onto YouTube on 22 March 2015 at a total length of three minutes and eleven seconds.

Track listing

Release history

References

2015 singles
Shift K3Y songs
2015 songs
Columbia Records singles
Songs written by Shift K3Y